Cymbidium madidum, commonly known as the giant boat-lip orchid, is a plant in the orchid family and is endemic to north-eastern Australia. It is a clump-forming epiphyte or lithophyte with crowded pseudobulbs, each with between four and eight flat, strap-shaped, thin leaves and up to seventy olive green flowers with the sepals and petals curving forwards. It is found in moist habitats in eastern Queensland and north-eastern New South Wales.

Description
The side lobes are erect and the middle lobe is yellowish and has a shiny ridge along its midline. Flowering occurs between August and February.

Taxonomy and naming
Cymbidium madidum was first formally described in 1840 by John Lindley who published the description in Edwards's Botanical Register. The specific epithet (madidum) is a Latin word meaning "moist", "soaked" or "sodden".

Distribution and habitat
The giant boat-lip orchid grows in rainforest and other moist habitats on trees with fibrous or papery bark and on rocks and cliffs. It is found from the Cape York Peninsula in Queensland south to the Hastings River in New South Wales.

Traditional uses
Australian aborigines and early European settlers used pseudobulbs of Cymbidium madidum  for dysentery and its seeds were used as an oral contraceptive.

References 

madidum
Endemic orchids of Australia
Plants described in 1840
Orchids of Queensland
Orchids of New South Wales
Abortifacients